Jasimuddin (1903–1976) was a Bangladeshi poet.

Jasimuddin may also refer to:

 Mohammad Jashimuddin (politician), Bangladeshi politician and a former Jatiya Sangsad member from Bhola-3
 Jasimuddin (cricketer), Bangladeshi cricketer
 Jashimuddin (born 1995), Bangladeshi cricketer
Muhammad Jasimuddin Rahmani, Bangladeshi terrorist